Malang Mané (born 30 November 1943) is a Senegalese sprinter. He competed in the 4 × 100 metres relay at the 1964 Summer Olympics and the 1972 Summer Olympics.

References

1943 births
Living people
Athletes (track and field) at the 1964 Summer Olympics
Athletes (track and field) at the 1972 Summer Olympics
Senegalese male sprinters
Olympic athletes of Senegal
Place of birth missing (living people)
African Games gold medalists in athletics (track and field)
African Games gold medalists for Senegal
Athletes (track and field) at the 1965 All-Africa Games